Andreas "Andi" Zuber (born 9 October 1983 in Judenburg, Austria) is a motor racing driver. An Austrian by birth, he is based in Dubai and once raced under a licence issued by the United Arab Emirates.

Career

Formula König
Despite beginning his karting career in 1998, 2000 saw his debut in the Formula König championship with Team Böhm Sport. Zuber finished twelfth in the championship with 39 points.

Formula Renault
The following season, Zuber competed in both the Formula Renault 2.0 Germany and Eurocup Formula Renault 2.0 championships for Motopark Academy. He finished sixth in the German series standings. In the Eurocup, he took 54th place in the championship, with a best finish of seventeenth at the A1-Ring.

For 2002, the Austrian driver remained in the German championship with Motopark Academy. He finished second behind Dutch driver Ferdinand Kool in final standings. Also he was a guest driver at the Oschersleben round of the Eurocup.

Formula Three
Zuber moved on to new-for-2003 Formula 3 Euro Series with Team Rosberg. He finished in 24th place in the standings with two points scored for seventh place in the first race at Le Mans.

He continued in the F3 Euroseries in 2004 with Team Rosberg, finishing 21st without scoring a point, with a ninth place at Brno being his best result.

Formula Renault 3.5 Series
Zuber drove for Carlin Motorsport in the Formula Renault 3.5 Series in 2005, finishing sixth in the championship with one win at Estoril and pole position at Valencia apiece.

GP2 Series
He switched to the GP2 Series for 2006 for the new Trident Racing team, where he partnered Gianmaria Bruni. After a slow start to his championship, he took his first race victory in the formula at the penultimate race meeting of the season at the Istanbul Park track, in which he was the only driver to hold off Lewis Hamilton, after the eventual champion spun early in the race but climbed back up to second position. This win complemented Bruni's two triumphs earlier in the year and established Zuber in fourteenth position in the championship.

Zuber moved to iSport International for 2007, where he was paired with Timo Glock. He took a perfect result of pole position, win and fastest lap at the Silverstone feature race, but his overall season was inconsistent and he finished ninth in the championship, compared to Glock's championship-winning campaign. The team-mates also collided with one another when accelerating away from the grid at the start of the Magny-Cours feature race, after starting from the front row.

For 2008, Zuber switched to the Piquet Sports team alongside Pastor Maldonado. Four podium finishes saw him repeat his ninth place in the championship of the previous year, but he failed to achieve a race victory for the first time in the category. He was also outperformed by Maldonado, who finished fifth overall with almost double the number of points. He was not helped by failing to score any points in the final seven races of the season, a run which included disqualification from third place at the Spa-Francorchamps for a technical infringement that both he and the team considered to be particularly unfair. Zuber also drove in the first two rounds of the 2008–09 GP2 Asia Series season for the FMS International team, after which he was replaced by Rodolfo González.

Zuber returned to FMS for the 2009 GP2 Series season, where he was partnered by Luiz Razia. Despite scoring more podium finishes, the year was unstable off-track: first Giancarlo Fisichella's stake in the team was bought back by the Coloni family, its original founder and owner; then the outfit missed the eighth round of the championship after its cars were impounded as a result of court proceedings initiated by driver Andy Soucek, who had briefly been employed by FMS. Zuber eventually wound up in thirteenth place overall.

Superleague Formula
Zuber has also represented Al Ain in the Superleague Formula, a championship in which the cars represent different football teams.

Racing record

Career summary

Complete Formula 3 Euro Series results
(key)

Complete Formula Renault 3.5 Series results
(key) (Races in bold indicate pole position) (Races in italics indicate fastest lap)

Complete GP2 Series results
(key) (Races in bold indicate pole position) (Races in italics indicate fastest lap)

Complete GP2 Asia Series results
(key) (Races in bold indicate pole position) (Races in italics indicate fastest lap)

Superleague Formula

 * Al Ain FC overall standing. There is no drivers' championship in the Superleague Formula.

FIA GT competition results

GT1 World Championship results

FIA GT Series results

References

External links
 Official site 
 Andreas Zuber career statistics at Driver Database

1983 births
Living people
People from Judenburg
GP2 Series drivers
German Formula Renault 2.0 drivers
Formula Renault Eurocup drivers
Austrian racing drivers
Emirati racing drivers
Superleague Formula drivers
GP2 Asia Series drivers
World Series Formula V8 3.5 drivers
Formula 3 Euro Series drivers
FIA GT1 World Championship drivers
ADAC GT Masters drivers
Carlin racing drivers
Trident Racing drivers
Sportspeople from Styria
Motopark Academy drivers
Team Rosberg drivers
ISport International drivers
Piquet GP drivers
Scuderia Coloni drivers
Phoenix Racing drivers
Sébastien Loeb Racing drivers